Riverwood may refer to:

Places
Australia
Riverwood, New South Wales, a suburb of Sydney, Australia
Riverwood railway station

United States
Riverwood, Indiana
Riverwood, Kentucky
Riverwood, Oregon
Riverwoods, Illinois
Riverwood (Nashville, Tennessee), a house listed on the National Register of Historic Places

Schools
Riverwood High School, Sandy Springs, Georgia, United States

The Elder Scrolls V: Skyrim
Riverwood (Skyrim village), a village in Skyrim's Whiterun Hold.